Kiril Ivanov (born 27 May 1943) is a Bulgarian volleyball player. He competed in the men's tournament at the 1964 Summer Olympics.

References

External links
 

1943 births
Living people
Bulgarian men's volleyball players
Olympic volleyball players of Bulgaria
Volleyball players at the 1964 Summer Olympics
Place of birth missing (living people)